Moacyr, also spelled Moacir, is a Brazilian masculine name of Tupi origin. According to the Brazilian philologist Eduardo de Almeida Navarro, it means "regret", "repentance".

It can refer to:
 Moacir Barbosa Nascimento (1921–2000), nicknamed Barbosa, Brazilian footballer
 Moacyr Claudino Pinto da Silva (born 1936), nicknamed Moacir or Moacyr, Brazilian former footballer
 Moacir Costa da Silva (born 1986), nicknamed Moacir, Brazilian footballer
 Moacyr Brondi Daiuto (1915–1994), Brazilian basketball coach 
 Moacyr Filho Domingos Demiquei (born 1981), nicknamed Moacyr Filho or Nenê, Brazilian footballer 
 Moacyr Grechi OSM (1936–2019), Brazilian Roman Catholic archbishop
 Moacyr José Vitti CSS (1940–2014), Roman Catholic archbishop
 Moacyr Scliar (1937–2011), Brazilian writer and physician